Jean-Marcel Brouzes (born 3 June 1953) is a French former cyclist. He competed in the team pursuit event at the 1976 Summer Olympics.

References

External links
 

1953 births
Living people
French male cyclists
Olympic cyclists of France
Cyclists at the 1976 Summer Olympics
People from Drancy
French track cyclists
Sportspeople from Seine-Saint-Denis
Cyclists from Île-de-France
21st-century French people
20th-century French people